Fishing Without Nets may refer to:

Fishing Without Nets (2012 film), short film by Cutter Hodierne
Fishing Without Nets (2014 film), feature film by Cutter Hodierne